Otukpo is a town in Benue State, Nigeria located in the Middle Belt Region of Nigeria. It is also the eponymous name of a subgroup of the Idoma people. Otukpo is the headquarters of the Otukpo Local Government Area. It was the headquarters of the former Idoma Province, and remains an important town in Idomaland, an area mainly populated by the Idoma speaking people, though with numerous local dialects spoken in the diverse reaches of Idoma land. Otukpo Idoma language is the umbrella lingua.

Otukpo is the seat of the Och' Idoma, the Paramount Ruler Idoma of the Idoma Nation. The Present Traditional Ruler of Idoma is His Royal Majesty Ogbodo John Elaigwu. Though his legitimacy as Och Idoma is been questioned by  large Section of the Idoma Elites, Traditional District Heads, and Youth. As at the time of publication the case is sai to be in court. Elaigwu Ogbodo was a card carrying member of the PDP and a close ally with the Deputy Governorship candidate and Chairman John Ngbede. It is said Ngbede was very instrumental to his emergence as king.

Climate 

Otukpo has a tropical savanna climate. It is warm every month with both a wet and dry season. The average annual temperature for Otukpo is 64° degrees and there is about 244 inch of rain in a year. It is dry for 169 days a year with an average humidity of 61% and an UV-index of 7. The climate is tropical in Otukpo. The average annual temperature in Otukpo is 27.2 °C. In the month of August, the average temperature is 25.5 °C. It is the lowest average temperature of the whole year.

Religion 
The people of Otukpo are predominantly Christians. Christianity came into the town during the colonial era. The Roman Catholic church is the pioneer church in the land and is popularly referred to as Church 'ufada' (the Reverend Father's church). The Methodist church is also popular in the area. Of late, there has been proliferation of Pentecostal churches in Otukpo. There is also the presence of traditional worship (Alekwu) in Otukpo. Although traditional worship is gradually going extinct, the Alekwu (ancestral) Onyonkpo and Achukwu deities are held sacred in many villages of Otukpo. There is also the practice of Islam by the indigenous people of Otukpo. The Abu family in Otukpo town are the first indigenous Idoma people in Otukpo that embraced and practised Islam. Other Idoma indigenes that practised Islam in Otukpo are the Sule Ujor family, Sule Audu and the Samsudeen Amali family. Also, the family of professor samsudeen Amali of Upu village are of the Islamic faith.

Transport 
Otukpo is served by a train station on the national railway network as well as numerous bus and taxi services such as Benue Links, Ejifa Transport, Silver Travels, Pleasure Travels, Calculux and Ifesinachi which travel to every major city in Nigeria daily.

Some prominent places in otukpo 

 Ogobia,
 Upu,
 Otukpoicho,
 Otobi,
 Adoka,
 Oyagede, and
 Akpa-Igede.

See also 

 Railway stations in Nigeria
 Roman Catholic Diocese of Otukpo
 St. Mark's Country Golf Course

References 

http://www.idoma.info/history.php

Local Government Areas in Benue State